The Admiralty of the Noorderkwartier (Dutch, 'Northern Quarter'), also known as the Admiralty of West Friesland, was one of the five admiralties of the Dutch Republic, made up of West Friesland, a region in the north of the province of Holland.

History
It was set up on 6 March 1589 by a resolution of the Parliament of the Netherlands, via a decision of the Stadholder Maurits of Orange.  It was established at Hoorn (and in Enkhuizen for about three months in  1597).  The admiralty was disestablished in 1795.

Fleet guardians
Known fleet guardians of the admiralty include:

External links
Admiraliteit van het Noorderkwartier

1589 establishments in the Dutch Republic
1795 disestablishments
Noorderkwartier
History of North Holland